|}

The Star Appeal Stakes is a Listed flat horse race in Ireland open to thoroughbreds aged two years old. It is run at Dundalk over a distance of 7 furlongs (1,408 metres), and it is scheduled to take place each year in October.

The race was first run in 2007.

Records
Leading jockey (3 wins):
 Joseph O'Brien – Lines of Battle (2012), Smuggler's Cove (2014), Hit It A Bomb (2015)
 Seamie Heffernan -  Giovanni Boldini (2013), No Needs Never (2018), Spirit Gal (2022) 

Leading trainer (5 wins):
 Aidan O'Brien – Lines of Battle (2012), Giovanni Boldini (2013), Smuggler's Cove (2014), Hit It A Bomb (2015), Fort Myers (2019)

Winners

See also
 Horse racing in Ireland
 List of Irish flat horse races

References
Racing Post: 

Flat races in Ireland
Flat horse races for two-year-olds
Dundalk Stadium
Recurring sporting events established in 2007
2007 establishments in Ireland